Yunoki Station (柚木駅) is the name of two train stations in Japan:

 Yunoki Station (Shizuoka, Shizuoka)
 Yunoki Station (Fuji, Shizuoka)